Muslim Youth Helpline (MYH) is a national helpline in the UK providing free and confidential faith and culturally sensitive support services targeted at vulnerable young people. It is registered as a charity.

History

2001-2003: Foundation
MYH was founded in August 2001 by Mohammed Sadiq Mamdani, who at the time was 18, in response to the social problems endured by Muslim youth in the UK. It was at college that Mamdani first realised the extent of isolation that today's young Muslims experience; while problems such as drug misuse, depression and sexuality are issues common among many young people, he believed that young Muslims often need advice that takes into account broader religious and social contexts.

2004-2006: Recognition, expansion, campaigns
By 2004, MYH had expanded nationwide and was the only telephone helpline of its kind in the UK. It started running a befriending scheme through which volunteers meet up with young Muslims on a social basis or provide practical help such as accompanying them to job centres, or helping fill in application forms whenever guidance is needed.

In 2004, MYH released a Prison Campaign on muslimyouth.net and was called "Behind Bars". After the huge success of the initial campaign it was adopted by MYH as an annual campaign. In 2005 they launched its "Doing a Runner" campaign to raise awareness within the community of the many young Muslims who run away from home, and may at various times in their life find themselves vulnerable, alone and homeless. The campaign concluded with "2 Dayz of Street Life", an event involving members of the public who stayed in shelters and on the streets for two days to experience what a homeless person may go through. In February 2006 MYH was awarded with the CSV Award for the "Most Heart Warming Project" of its kind.

2013-present
An annual dinner takes place in May. In May 2014, special guests included Jemima Khan, Asad Ahmed, Mishal Husain amongst others.

Description
Muslim Youth Helpline is a national helpline, registered as a charity, providing free and confidential faith and culturally sensitive support services targeted at vulnerable young people in the United Kingdom. It does not propagate any religious or political beliefs, seeking only to provide relief to and improve the social condition of vulnerable young people.

Awards and Accreditation
MYH has won the following awards:
 2003: AOL Innovation in the Community Award
 2003: National Council for Voluntary Youth Services Young Partners Award 
 2003: Phillip Lawrence Award
 2003: Muslim News Community Development Award 
 2003: BT Telephone Helplines Association Helpline Volunteer of the Year Award
 2004: Muslim News Award for Excellence in Community Development 
 2004: Whitbread Young Achievers Award (awarded to Mohammed Sadiq Mamdani) 
 2004: Purple Youth Award for "Best Youth Site" awarded to muslimyouth.net
 2005: Investors in People Accreditation 
 2005: Community Care Award 
 2005: CSV "Most Heart Warming Campaign" awarded to Prison Campaign
 2007: Malcolm X Young Persons Award for Excellence (awarded to muslimyouth.net)

References

External links
 

Islamic youth organizations
Islamic charities based in the United Kingdom
Crisis hotlines
Charities based in London
Charities based in Brent
Youth organisations based in the United Kingdom